Thomas Smith was the fourth recorded Registrary of the University of Cambridge.

Mere was born in Northamptonshire. He entered Trinity College, Cambridge in 1576. He graduated B.A. in 1580 and M.A. in 1583. He was elected a Fellow of St John's College, Cambridge from 1534 to 1548. He was Esquire Bedell from 1585 to 1592 and Registrary from 1591 until 1600.

References

External links
 More online references

Year of birth unknown
Year of death missing
Alumni of Trinity College, Cambridge
Fellows of St John's College, Cambridge
Registraries of the University of Cambridge
People from Northamptonshire